Budimlja is a small town in the municipality of Berane, Montenegro.

History 
In the Turkish Defter of 1582, For the first time in this area, Vlachs were mentioned as inhabitants. There were 3 houses in the settlement, 2 being Vlach houses. Vlachs were the rulers of this area and the people enjoyed being under their rule.

Demographics 
According to the 2011 census, its population was 1,994.

References

Sources 

Populated places in Berane Municipality
Serb communities in Montenegro